The 2021 Canadian Open (branded as the 2021 National Bank Open presented by Rogers for sponsorship reasons) were outdoor hard court tennis tournaments played from August 6 to August 15, 2021, as part of the 2021 US Open Series. The men's event took place at the Aviva Centre in Toronto, and the women's tournament at the IGA Stadium in Montreal. It was the 131st edition of the men's tournament—a Masters 1000 tournament on the 2021 ATP Tour, and the 119th edition of the women's tournament—a WTA 1000 tournament on the 2021 WTA Tour.

They were originally scheduled to be played from August 8 to August 16, 2020, as part of the 2020 tennis season. Due to the COVID-19 pandemic, the 2020 edition of the Canadian Open was postponed to 2021 by Tennis Canada.

Impact of the COVID-19 pandemic, postponement to 2021 

The men's and women's tournaments alternate between Toronto and Montreal annually. On April 11, 2020, pursuant to a request by the province of Quebec (the COVID-19 pandemic in Quebec was the centre of the first wave of the pandemic in Canada) for all cultural and sporting events to be cancelled through August, Tennis Canada announced that the women's half of the Canadian Open, as part of the 2020 WTA Tour, would be postponed and held in Montreal in 2021.

The men's half of the event was still tentatively scheduled, but was still at risk of cancellation or postponement if the ATP and WTA extended their suspension of play into August, or if Toronto or the province of Ontario made a similar order that also applies to the period. Toronto had already cancelled all city-led major events, festivals, conferences, permits and cultural programs until June 30, 2020. Although subject to provincial restrictions on public gatherings, Mayor John Tory stated that these did not necessarily bar the hosting of sporting events.

On June 17, 2020, Tennis Canada officially announced that the men's tournament had also been postponed to 2021, citing logistical and safety issues that would be present for players and staff even if the event were to be held behind closed doors, including a federal health order requiring 14 days self-isolation upon arrival for anyone travelling to Canada. As they have been postponed, the men's and women's tournaments will still be held in Toronto and Montreal as per the traditional rotation.

On February 1, 2021, National Bank was promoted to title sponsor of the tournament, replacing Rogers Communications, which now serves as presenting sponsor.

Points and prize money

Point distribution

Prize money

*per team

Champions

Men's singles

  Daniil Medvedev def.  Reilly Opelka, 6–4, 6–3.

Women's singles

  Camila Giorgi def.  Karolína Plíšková, 6–3, 7–5.

This was Giorgi's third WTA Tour singles title, and first at WTA 1000 level.

Men's doubles

  Rajeev Ram /  Joe Salisbury def.  Nikola Mektić /  Mate Pavić, 6–3, 4–6, [10–3]

Women's doubles

  Gabriela Dabrowski /  Luisa Stefani def.  Darija Jurak /  Andreja Klepač, 6–3, 6–4

ATP singles main-draw entrants

Seeds
The following are the seeded players. Rankings are as of August 2, 2021. Points before are as of August 9, 2021.

Because the tournament is being held one week later than the last edition in 2019 and as a result of special ranking adjustment rules due to COVID, the Points before column already reflects either a 50% reduction in the player's 2019 points or the substitution of the player's next best result. Accordingly, the Points defending column has been adjusted to show the greater of (a) 50% of the player's 2019 points and (b) the player's 19th best result.

Following the tournament, players will count either their 2021 points or 50% of their 2019 points, whichever is greater.

In addition, because the tournament is not mandatory in 2021, players may count their next best result instead if that result is better. Accordingly, points after will differ from points before only if the player's 2021 points won exceed points defending. 

† Due to a change in schedule for the 2021 tournament and COVID ranking adjustment rules, the Points defending column reflects the greater of (a) 50% of the player's 2019 points and (b) the player's 19th best result. Instances of the latter are enclosed in parentheses.

‡ Because the 2021 tournament was non-mandatory, the player substituted his 19th best result instead of the points won in this tournament.

Other entrants
The following players received wild cards into the main singles draw:
  Jenson Brooksby
  Nick Kyrgios
  Vasek Pospisil

The following player received entry using a protected ranking into the main singles draw:
  Kei Nishikori

The following player received entry using a special exempt into the main singles draw:
  Mackenzie McDonald

The following players received entry from the singles qualifying draw:
  Ričardas Berankis
  James Duckworth
  Yoshihito Nishioka
  Tommy Paul
  Emil Ruusuvuori
  Brayden Schnur

The following players received entry as lucky losers:
  Feliciano López
  Frances Tiafoe

Withdrawals
Before the tournament
  Matteo Berrettini → replaced by  Jan-Lennard Struff
  Pablo Carreño Busta → replaced by  Benoît Paire
  Borna Ćorić → replaced by  John Millman
  Novak Djokovic → replaced by  Dušan Lajović
  Roger Federer → replaced by  Miomir Kecmanović
  David Goffin → replaced by  Albert Ramos Viñolas
  Rafael Nadal → replaced by  Feliciano López
  Dominic Thiem → replaced by  Taylor Fritz
  Milos Raonic → replaced by  Lloyd Harris
  Stan Wawrinka → replaced by  Marin Čilić
  Alexander Zverev → replaced by  Frances Tiafoe

During the tournament
  Kei Nishikori

ATP doubles main-draw entrants

Seeds

Rankings are as of August 2, 2021.

Other entrants
The following pairs received wildcards into the doubles main draw: 
  Félix Auger-Aliassime /  Alexis Galarneau 
  Grigor Dimitrov /  Vasek Pospisil
  Peter Polansky /  Brayden Schnur

The following pair received entry as alternates:
  Miomir Kecmanović /  Casper Ruud

Withdrawals
Before the tournament
  Grigor Dimitrov /  Vasek Pospisil → replaced by  Miomir Kecmanović /  Casper Ruud
  Marcel Granollers /  Horacio Zeballos → replaced by  Oliver Marach /  Philipp Oswald
  Wesley Koolhof /  Jean-Julien Rojer → replaced by  Wesley Koolhof /  Austin Krajicek
  Filip Krajinović /  Dušan Lajović → replaced by  Aslan Karatsev /  Dušan Lajović
  Jan-Lennard Struff /  Alexander Zverev → replaced by  Marin Čilić /  Jan-Lennard Struff

WTA singles main-draw entrants

Seeds

 1 Rankings are as of August 2, 2021

Other entrants
The following players received wild cards into the main singles draw:
  Leylah Annie Fernandez 
  Simona Halep
  Rebecca Marino
  Sloane Stephens
  Carol Zhao

The following players received entry from the singles qualifying draw:
  Amanda Anisimova
  Clara Burel
  Harriet Dart
  Océane Dodin
  Caroline Garcia
  Tereza Martincová
  Anastasia Potapova
  Alison Van Uytvanck

Withdrawals
Before the tournament
  Ekaterina Alexandrova → replaced by  Kateřina Siniaková
  Ashleigh Barty → replaced by  Danielle Collins
  Belinda Bencic → replaced by  Jil Teichmann
  Jennifer Brady → replaced by  Camila Giorgi
  Sofia Kenin → replaced by  Anastasija Sevastova
  Angelique Kerber → replaced by  Ajla Tomljanović
  Barbora Krejčiková → replaced by  Marie Bouzková
  Naomi Osaka → replaced by  Fiona Ferro
  Iga Świątek → replaced by  Liudmila Samsonova
  Markéta Vondroušová → replaced by  Zhang Shuai

During the tournament
  Johanna Konta (left knee injury)

Retirements
  Marie Bouzková (dizziness)
  Tereza Martincová (abdominal pain)
  Anastasia Potapova (left ankle injury)
  Zhang Shuai (left leg injury)

WTA doubles main-draw entrants

Seeds

Rankings are as of August 2, 2021.

Other entrants
The following pairs received wildcards into the doubles main draw:
  Mélodie Collard /  Carol Zhao 
  Leylah Annie Fernandez /  Rebecca Marino

The following pairs received entry as alternates:
  Harriet Dart /  Anett Kontaveit
  Océane Dodin /  Kamilla Rakhimova

Withdrawals
Before the tournament
  Marie Bouzková /  Lucie Hradecká → replaced by  Elixane Lechemia /  Ingrid Neel
  Chan Hao-ching /  Latisha Chan → replaced by  Vivian Heisen /  Alicja Rosolska
  Kaitlyn Christian /  Nao Hibino → replaced by  Kaitlyn Christian /  Christina McHale
  Anna Danilina /  Lidziya Marozava → replaced by  Ulrikke Eikeri /  Catherine Harrison
  Eri Hozumi /  Zhang Shuai → replaced by  Océane Dodin /  Kamilla Rakhimova
  Miyu Kato /  Sabrina Santamaria → replaced by  Emina Bektas /  Tara Moore
  Barbora Krejčíková /  Kateřina Siniaková → replaced by  Beatrice Gumulya /  Emily Webley-Smith
  Sofia Kenin /  Jeļena Ostapenko → replaced by  Jeļena Ostapenko /  Dayana Yastremska
  Anastasia Potapova /  Vera Zvonareva → replaced by  Harriet Dart /  Anett Kontaveit

References

External links

2021 in Canadian tennis
2021
August 2021 sports events in Canada